Nicola Anne Peltz Beckham (born January 9, 1995) is an American actress. 

Peltz has appeared in roles as Katara in The Last Airbender (2010), Bradley Martin in the A&E drama series Bates Motel (2013–2015) and Tessa Yeager in Transformers: Age of Extinction (2014), a role for which she received a Young Hollywood Award's nomination. 

She is married to Brooklyn Beckham, the son of soccer star David Beckham and fashion designer and former pop singer Victoria Beckham.

Early life
Peltz was born in Westchester County, New York, the daughter of billionaire businessman Nelson Peltz and model Claudia Heffner. She has one sister and six brothers, including former professional hockey player Brad Peltz and actor Will Peltz. She also has two half-siblings from her father's previous marriages. Although her mother never converted to Judaism, her father was a devout Jew and had his sons barmitzvahed.

Career
Peltz made her film debut as Mackenzie in the Christmas comedy Deck the Halls (2006). The following year, she appeared in a Manhattan Theatre Club production of Blackbird. She later co-starred as Becki in the comedy film Harold (2008), and in June 2008, she appeared in the music video for Miley Cyrus's single "7 Things." Two years later, she portrayed Katara in the fantasy adventure film The Last Airbender (2010), directed by M. Night Shyamalan.

In 2013, Peltz began appearing as part of the main cast in A&E's drama-thriller series Bates Motel. She portrayed Bradley Martin, a love interest for the young Norman Bates. She left the main cast following the second episode of the second season, but returned as a guest star for the final three episodes of the third season. The following year, Peltz starred as Tessa Yeager, in the fourth Transformers film Transformers: Age of Extinction (2014). Later that year she appeared as Kate Miller in the teen drama film Affluenza. In October 2015, she walked the runway for Alexander Wang's last fashion show for Balenciaga at Paris Fashion Week. She then joined the cast of the dark comedy film Youth in Oregon (2016), playing Annie Gleason. Peltz appeared in the music video for Zayn Malik's single "It's You" in February 2016.

Peltz was cast as Chrissy Monroe in the Hulu drama series When the Street Lights Go On, based on a Black List script of the same name. She appeared in Alex Pettyfer's directorial debut film Back Roads and starred alongside Thomas Mann in the sci-fi film Our House, directed by Anthony Scott Burns. In 2019, she co-starred in the drama The Obituary of Tunde Johnson as Marley Meyers. In 2020, she portrayed Felicity in romantic comedy Holidate.

Personal life
On July 11, 2020, Peltz and Brooklyn Beckham announced their engagement. On April 9, 2022, Peltz and Beckham were married in Palm Beach, Florida, in a Jewish ceremony (Beckham’s great grandfather was Jewish). Peltz announced on Instagram that they adopted a dog in October, and they encouraged fans to adopt or foster animals. That earned them a PETA 2022 award as a Pawsome Adoption Advocate.

She and her brother Will Peltz have similar Hebrew and Yiddish tattoos on their ribs. His says "family", which is written the same way in both Hebrew and Yiddish, while hers says "family first" in Yiddish.

Filmography

Film

Television

Music videos

Awards and nominations

References

External links

 
 
 

1995 births
21st-century American actresses
Actresses from New York (state)
American child actresses
American film actresses
American television actresses
Jewish American actresses
Living people
People from Westchester County, New York
Peltz family
21st-century American Jews